Oscar Lapham (June 29, 1837 – March 29, 1926) was an American lawyer and politician from the U.S. state of Rhode Island. He served as a member of the Rhode Island Senate and the United States House of Representatives.

Early life
Lapham was born in Burrillville, Rhode Island and attended the Smithville Seminary in Scituate, Rhode Island, Pembroke Academy in Pembroke, New Hampshire and the University Grammar School in Providence, Rhode Island. In 1864, he graduated from Brown University. At Brown, he was a member of Phi Beta Kappa and Delta Kappa Epsilon. Lapham studied law and was admitted to the bar in 1867. He began the practice of law in Providence.

Career
During the American Civil War, he served as first lieutenant, adjutant and captain in the Twelfth Rhode Island Volunteers.  After the war, he was elected as a companion of the Massachusetts Commandery of the Military Order of the Loyal Legion of the United States.

He was a member of the Rhode Island Senate in 1887 and 1888, and served as chairman of the Judiciary Committee. He was treasurer of the Rhode Island Democratic Committee from 1887-1891.

Lapham was an unsuccessful candidate for election to the Forty-eighth, Fiftieth, and Fifty-first Congresses. He was elected as a Democratic candidate to the Fifty-second and Fifty-third Congresses, serving from March 4, 1891 to March 3, 1895. He was an unsuccessful candidate for reelection in 1894 to the Fifty-fourth Congress.

After leaving Congress, he resumed the practice of law in Providence. He served on the board of trustees and on the executive committee for his alma mater Brown University. He was a member of the Providence Board of Trade.

He died on March 29, 1926 in Providence and is interred in the Swan Point Cemetery there.

Family life
Lapham was the son of Duty Lapham and Lucinda (Wheelock) Lapham. He married Claira L. Paine on June 20, 1876, and their only child Annie died in infancy.

References

External links 
 

	
	

1837 births
1926 deaths
People from Burrillville, Rhode Island
Politicians from Providence, Rhode Island
People from Providence County, Rhode Island
Rhode Island lawyers
Democratic Party Rhode Island state senators
Brown University alumni
Union Army officers
People of Rhode Island in the American Civil War
Burials at Swan Point Cemetery
Democratic Party members of the United States House of Representatives from Rhode Island
19th-century American lawyers